Cherry plum may refer to:
The species Prunus cerasifera
Plum-cherry hybrids
 Prunus × rossica cultivars